This is a summary of the electoral history of William Massey, Prime Minister of New Zealand, (1912–1925). He represented two electorates during his political career.

Parliamentary elections

1893 election

1894 by-election

1896 election

1899 election

1902 election

1905 election

1908 election

1911 election

1914 election

1919 election

1922 election

Notes

References

Massey, William